Rashid al-Din Sinan ( Rashīd ad-Dīn Sinān; 1131/1135 – 1193) also known as the Old Man of the Mountain ( Shaykh al-Jabal), was a da'i (missionary) and leader of the Syrian branch of the Nizari Isma'ili state (the Assassin Order) from 1162 until his death in 1193. He was also a prominent figure in the history of the Crusades.

Biography
Rashid ad-Din Sinan was born between the years 1131 and 1135 in Basra, southern Iraq, to a prosperous family. According to his autobiography, of which only fragments survive, Rashid came to Alamut, the fortress headquarters of the Assassins, as a youth after an argument with his brothers, and received the typical Assassin training. In 1162, the sect's leader Ḥassan ʿAlā Dhikrihi's Salām sent him to Syria, where he proclaimed Qiyamah (repeating the ceremony of Hassan II at Alamut), which in Nizari terminology meant the time of the Qa'im and the removal of Islamic law. Based at the Nizari strongholds al-Kahf and later Masyaf, he controlled the northern Syrian districts of Jabal as-Summaq, Maarrat Misrin and Sarmin.

Rashid enjoyed considerable independence from the Nizari centre in Alamut and some writings attribute him with a semi-divine status usually given to the Nizari Ismaili Imam.

His chief enemy, the Sultan Saladin (1137/1138–1193), ruled over Egypt and Syria from 1174 to 1193. Saladin managed twice to elude assassination attempts ordered by Rashid and as he was marching against Aleppo, Saladin devastated the Nizari possessions. In 1176, Saladin laid siege to Masyaf but he lifted the siege after two notable events that reputedly transpired between him and the Old Man of the Mountain. According to one version, one night, Saladin's guards noticed a spark glowing down the hill of Masyaf and then vanishing among the Ayyubid tents. Saladin awoke from his sleep to find a figure leaving the tent. He saw that the lamps in his tent were displaced and beside his bed laid hot scones of the shape peculiar to the Assassins with a note at the top pinned by a poisoned dagger. The note threatened that he would be killed if he did not withdraw from his siege. Saladin gave a loud cry, exclaiming that Sinan himself was the figure that left the tent. As such, Saladin told his guards to come to an agreement with Sinan. Realizing he was unable to subdue the Assassins, he sought to align himself with them, consequently depriving the Crusaders of aligning themselves against him.

Sinan's last notable act occurred in 1191, when he ordered the successful assassination of the newly elected King of Jerusalem Conrad of Montferrat. Whether this happened in coordination with King Richard I of England, with Saladin, or with neither, remains unknown.

In 1193, Sinan wrote a letter to Leopold V, Duke of Austria at the request of Richard I, taking credit for the assassination order and subsequent death of Conrad of Monferrat, of which Richard was being accused.  However, this letter is believed by modern historians to be a forgery written after Sinan's death.

He died in 1193 in al-Kahf Castle in Masyaf and was buried in Salamiyah. He was succeeded by the Persian da'i Abu Mansur ibn Muhammad or Nasr al-'Ajami appointed from Alamut, which regained a closer supervision over the Syrian branch of the Assassin Order.

In popular culture 
A fictionalized version of Rashid ad-Din Sinan (referred to as "Al Mualim", meaning The Mentor) appears in Ubisoft's historical video game Assassin's Creed, voiced by Peter Renaday. As the Mentor (leader) of the Assassin Order in the late 12th century, he is a prominent figure in the Third Crusade and wishes to defeat the Assassins' longtime enemies, the Knights Templar, who are taking advantage of the Crusade for their own ends. After one of the Assassins, Altaïr Ibn-LaʼAhad, fails to recover an artifact, the Apple of Eden, from the Templars due to being blinded by arrogance, Al Mualim strips him of his rank and orders him to assassinate nine prominent Templars across the Holy Land to regain his rank and redeem himself. However, Al Mualim's desire to obtain the Apple leads him to secretly betray the Assassins and ally with the Templars, whom he eventually betrays as well. After Altaïr discovers the truth about Al Mualim's betrayal and alliance with the Templars from his final target, he confronts his mentor and kills him to prevent him from using the Apple (which is actually a piece of advanced technology that predates humanity) to enslave the human race, which Al Mualim believed would permanently end all conflict. In the game, Al Mualim's death occurs in 1191 rather than 1193.
Al Mualim reappears in Assassin's Creed: Revelations during two of Altaïr's memory sequences, one of which showcases his more positive relationship with Altaïr prior to his betrayal, while the other deals with the fallout from his death and its impact on Altaïr's later life, who succeeded Al Mualim as Mentor of the Order.
Al Mualim also has a minor role in Assassin's Creed Rogue where the modern-day Templar Juhani Otso Berg lists him as one of several examples of Assassins throughout history who betrayed the Order because their goals and beliefs aligned more with those of the Templars.

References

Bibliography
 
 Halm, Heinz, Die Schia, Darmstadt 1988, pp. 228f.
 Runciman, Steven: A history of the Crusades Volume 2: The kingdom of Jerusalem and the Frankish East pp. 410
 
 
 
 
 
 
 

Syrian Ismailis
Muslims of the Crusades
1130s births
1190s deaths
People from Basra
Order of Assassins
Saladin